The following lists events that happened during 1903 in New Zealand.

Incumbents

Regal and viceregal
Head of State – Edward VII
Governor – The Earl of Ranfurly GCMG

Government
The 15th New Zealand Parliament continued. In government was the Liberal Party.
Speaker of the House – Arthur Guinness (Liberal)
Prime Minister – Richard Seddon
Minister of Finance – Richard Seddon
Chief Justice – Sir Robert Stout

Parliamentary opposition
 Leader of the Opposition – Vacant until 11 September, then William Massey, (Independent).

Main centre leaders
Mayor of Auckland – Alfred Kidd then Edwin Mitchelson
Mayor of Wellington – John Aitken
Mayor of Christchurch – Henry Wigram
Mayor of Dunedin – James Park then Thomas Scott

Events

January

February

March

April

June

July

August

September
26 September – New Zealand is the first country in the world to pass a Wireless Telegraphy Act.

October

November

December

Arts and literature

See 1903 in art, 1903 in literature

Music

See: 1903 in music

Film

A Message from Mars

Sport

Boxing
The Bantamweight division is included in the national championships for the first time.

National amateur champions
Heavyweight – H. Taylor (Greymouth)
Middleweight – J. Griffin (Invercargill)
Lightweight – A. Farquharson (Dunedin)
Featherweight – A. Parker (Christchurch)
Bantamweight – J. Pearce (Christchurch)

Chess
National Champion: J.C. Grierson of Auckland.

Golf
The 11th National Amateur Championships were held in Napier 
 Men: Kurepo Tareha (Napier)
 Women: A. E Pearce

Horse racing

Harness racing
 Auckland Trotting Cup: Plain G

Rugby union
 1903 New Zealand rugby union tour of Australia

Soccer
Provincial league champions:
	Auckland:	YMCA Auckland
	Otago:	Northern
	Wellington:	Wellington St. John's

Births
 30 January: Colin Scrimgeour, minister and broadcaster.
 6 February: Jack Dunning, cricketer
 21 February: P. H. Matthews, politician
 11 March: George Dickinson, cricketer
 11 March: Ronald Syme, historian
 21 March: Frank Sargeson, writer
 28 March: Merton Hodge, west-end playwright
 23 April: John Stewart, politician.
 10 June: Count Geoffrey Potocki de Montalk, poet.
 6 July: Edward Musgrave Blaiklock, academic.
 4 August: Charles Bateson, historian and writer 
 2 November: Anna Lois White, painter
 15 November: Stewie Dempster, cricketer

Deaths
 7 March: John Studholme, politician and farmer (born 1829).
 23 April: William Travers, politician (born 1819). 
 11 June: Thomas Mason, horticulturist and politician. 
 7 July: Agnes Harrold, hotel manager, foster parent, nurse and midwife
 30 August: Joe Warbrick, rugby player (born 1862).

See also
History of New Zealand
List of years in New Zealand
Military history of New Zealand
Timeline of New Zealand history
Timeline of New Zealand's links with Antarctica
Timeline of the New Zealand environment

References

External links